Rich Man's Wardrobe – A Concise History of The Big Dish is a compilation album by Scottish pop band The Big Dish, which was released by Virgin in 1994.

The compilation gathers fourteen tracks from the band's first two album's, 1986's Swimmer and 1988's Creeping Up on Jesus, along with "Voodoo Baby", which was the B-side of the 1988 single "European Rain". No tracks from the band's 1991 album Satellites are included.

Background
Virgin first made plans to release a Big Dish compilation album in 1991, following the band's Top 40 success with their single "Miss America", released on East West Records. Lindsay was critical of the band's former label's decision and he told the New Musical Express in 1991, "We've heard that Virgin are already putting together a compilation of the first two albums to cash in on the 'Miss America' success – the bastards. They couldn't give a shit when we were actually on the label and now they're doing this."

Track listing

Personnel
Production
 Ian Ritchie – producer (tracks 1, 3, 12, 14–15)
 Paul Wickens – producer (tracks 2, 9)
 Bruce Lampcov – producer (tracks 4, 7–8, 10–11)
 Paul Hardiman – producer (track 5)
 The Big Dish – producers (tracks 6, 13)

Other
 Walker Evans – church photography (front cover)
 Simon Fowler – front cover photography
 Ronnie Gurr – sleeve notes

References

1994 compilation albums
Virgin Records compilation albums